Serghei Cebotari (born 21 February 1981) is a Moldovan football manager and former player who is currently the head coach of Bălți.

Playing career
During his playing career, Cebotari played in Moldova and Sweden.

Managerial career
Cebotari worked as a coach at CSCT Buiucani, Academia Chișinău and Zaria Bălți, before being appointed head coach of Sfîntul Gheorghe in April 2018. During his three and a half years at the club, Sfîntul Gheorghe reached the Moldovan Cup final three times, winning it once. The club also became runners-up of the Moldovan National Division once, and winners of the Moldovan Super Cup once. He left the club in September 2021. In January 2022, he was appointed head coach of Bălți.

Honours
Sfîntul Gheorghe
Moldovan Cup: 2020–21
Moldovan Super Cup: 2021

References

1981 births
Living people
Moldovan footballers
Moldovan expatriate footballers
Moldovan expatriate sportspeople in Sweden
Expatriate footballers in Sweden
Moldovan Super Liga players
Moldovan football managers
FC Sfîntul Gheorghe managers
CSF Bălți managers
Moldovan Super Liga managers